Joy Zipper is the debut album by the New York duo Joy Zipper, released in 1999.

Production
The duo recorded the album over two years, using three different home studios.

Critical reception
AllMusic wrote that "each pensive, dreamy song manages to be part of an intrinsic whole without being redundant." Trouser Press wrote: "Whether the relationship numerology of 'Like 24 (6 + 1 = 3)', Joy Zipper‘s opening track, actually adds up to anything is debatable, but the melody is a gift from the god of Brian Wilson’s teenage symphonies." The Evening Standard called the album "crammed with dream-struck, kooky melodies, rich textures and peaches 'n' cream vocals from Tabitha Tindale swirling gorgeously around Vinny Cafiso's darker tones."

Track listing
All songs written by Vincent Cafiso, except where noted:

References

2000 albums
Joy Zipper albums